Chungnam National University (CNU) is one of ten Flagship Korean National Universities located in Daejeon, South Korea.

History and introduction 
Chungnam National University was founded in 1952. Its motto is "Creativity, Development, and Service to the community". Situated in the central region of the Korean peninsula, CNU is located near the Daedeok R&D Special District, the Multifunctional Administrative City, the Daejeon Government Complex, and the Headquarters of the Korean Army, Air Force, and Navy.

Colleges and departments

Humanities
The College of Humanities offers programs in linguistic, literary, cultural, and human science fields.

Social Sciences
The college was established on March 1, 1990, as a separate division from the College of Humanities and College of Law. The main aim of the college is to provide students with academic, scientific, and professional knowledge in the fields of social sciences. The College of Social Sciences consists of eight departments.

Natural Sciences
The College of Natural Sciences aims at enabling students to acquire broad general education in the natural sciences and, its policy of emphasizing basic sciences encourages students and professors to exchange knowledge and research in conjunction with the adjacent Daedeok Research Complex.

Economics and Management
The College of Economics and Management aims to produce scholars who can contribute to economic planning and business administration in the industrial corporations of the country. The college holds seminars and special lectures and runs a computer center for the students so that they can get theories and do advanced research in economics and management.

Engineering
The College of Engineering, which boasts the longest history and the largest number of departments is one of the representative colleges of Chungnam National University. Adjacent to Daedeok Science Town, the birthplace of science and technology in Korea, CNU is able to maintain a close relationship with the research centers within the Science Town.
 
The faculty contributes to the development of industry in Korea through cooperating with the research centers run by private companies and governmental branches.

In 1994, the college was designated a State Policy College of Engineering. In 1999 it received designation as a college supported by the government-sponsored BK 21 project, and was awarded government funds to improve the environment of education and research. In the process, it created the foundation which leads to the famous College of Engineering.

Agriculture and Life Sciences
The College of Agriculture and Life Sciences was started in 1952. It consists of botanical resource division, zoological resource division, environmental forestry resource division, applied biological chemical food division, bioresources engineering division, and agricultural economy division.

There are 70 faculty members and 1900 undergraduate students and 300 graduate students who devote themselves to education and research in the  research centers such as the agricultural farms, animal farms, the experiment forest, and agricultural science research center.

In 1996, the College of Agriculture and Life Sciences was selected as a specialized college to cultivate ginseng, fruits, and vegetables. It introduced modern experimental equipment, the high-tech green house, and an experimental barn working by environmental adjustment.

In 2001, the first KT&G agricultural life science building in Korea was built. In 2002 a research center that focuses on converting the characters of cloned pigs was founded on funds and the sponsorship of the Korea Science foundation.

Research funds of more than 100 million Won and experimental equipment were provided to launch the international research and education center.

Law

The college aims at producing scholars and legal officials with knowledge in the fields of law and civil service. The college also aims at producing legal specialists such as judges and prosecutors who can contribute to the realization of peace and justice through legal knowledge. Students participate in a moot court, moot National Assembly exercises, and legal counseling exercises.

The college has graduated approximately 2,000 alumni.

Due to the establishment of the graduate J.D. program, the law school no longer admits undergraduate law students. The LL.B. program will be gradually phased out in favor of the Law School's graduate programs. CNU Law currently enrolls 100 students in each class of the J.D. program.

Pharmacy
The college aims at producing specialists who study and use pharmacological theories and practice.

Medicine

Human Ecology
The purposes of the college are to teach international academic theories in the fields of home and society and to instruct students in the ideal management of food, clothing, and shelter and cooperation with society and business in achieving goals.

Fine Arts and Music
The college provides research to develop culture in art and music. Students and alumni participate in art and music activities and express their creativity through concerts and exhibitions.

Veterinary Medicine
The present college of Veterinary Medicine was reorganized in March 1991 from the Department of Veterinary Medicine under the College of Agriculture and Life Sciences to the College of Veterinary Medicine. With its professional programs, the college produces specialists who conduct research on the anatomy of animals and their diseases.

Bioscience and Biotechnology

Education
The College of Education was established on March 1, 2009, yet the university has been providing teacher training since 1970. Most of graduates from the college serve for the position as secondary school teacher, educational administrator and university faculty.

Nursing

Faculty of Liberal Arts
The faculty of liberal arts, a faculty where students are free from fitting into one of the established major areas was established on March 1, 2009. The faculty provides students with academic disciplines including studies in humanities, social sciences and science & technology and fine arts.

Research institutes 
Furniture Industry Research Institute 
Management & Economics Research Institute 
Research Center for Advanced Magnetic Materials 
Cooperative Animal Experiment Center 
Engineering Education Institute 
Educational Research & Development Institute 
Rapidly Solidified Material Research Center 
Nano New Materials Engineering Center 
Institute of Agricultural Science &Technology 
Baekje Research Institute 
Institute of Law 
American-Canadian Studies Institute 
Institute of Social Science 
Industrial Technology Lab 
Institute of Life Sciences 
Research Institute of Human Ecology 
Material Chemical Lab 
Software Research Center 
Center for Asian Regional Studies 
Research Institute for Properties of Quantum-controlling Matter 
Survey Research Institute 
Women's Policy Research Institute 
Art Culture Research Institute 
Confucianism Research Institute 
Humanities Research Institute 
Internet Intrusion Response Technology Research Center 
Electric Wave Research Institute 
ElectroMagnetic Environment Research Center 
Information & Communication Research Institute 
Policy Research Institute for Small and Medium-sized Businesses 
Institute for Public Affairs(IPA) 
High-tech Vehicle Research Institute 
Research Institute of Physical Education & 
Sports Science 
Chungcheong Cultural Research 
Unification Research Institute 
Institute of Peace and Security Studies 
Research Institute of Marine Sciences 
Research Center for Transgenic Cloned Pigs 
Institute of Environment and Biosystem 
Accounting Research Institute 
Natural Science Lab 
Institute of Mathematical Sciences 
Institute of Applied Chemistry and Biological Engineering 
Nano-Engineering Research Institute 
Architectural Research Institute 
Architecture & Disaster Prevention Lab 
Plant Genomics Lab 
Institute of Scientific Criminal Investigation 
Research Center for International Technology Cooperation 
Research Center for Daedeok Patent Policy 
New Material Lab 
Institute of Biotechnology 
Co-operative Cancer Research Institute 
Research Institute of Medical Engineering 
Brain Science Research Institute 
Institute of Drug Research & Development 
Institute of Medical Science 
Nursing Science Institute 
Veterinary Medicine & Science Lab 
Basic Science Research Institute

Notable people
Kang Boo-ja, actress and politician

Gallery

See also
Flagship Korean National Universities
List of national universities in South Korea
List of universities and colleges in South Korea
Education in Korea

External links
 University Website (KOR)
 University Website (ENG)

Chungnam National University
Educational institutions established in 1952
National universities and colleges in South Korea
1952 establishments in South Korea